Maxim Alexandrovich Goncharov (born June 15, 1989) is a Russian professional ice hockey player. He is currently playing for HC Neftekhimik Nizhnekamsk of the Kontinental Hockey League (KHL). Goncharov was drafted 123rd overall in the 2007 NHL Entry Draft by the Phoenix Coyotes and played with their American Hockey League affiliate between 2010 and 2013.

Playing career
After playing with Salavat Yulaev Ufa for three seasons, Goncharov left as a free agent following the 2017–18 season, opting to sign a one-year contract with HC Spartak Moscow on May 8, 2018.

During his third year with Spartak Moscow in the 2020–21 season, Goncharov played in a reduced role appearing scoreless in just 8 games, before he was demoted to the VHL with affiliate, Khimik Voskresensk. Released from his contract with Spartak, Goncharov returned to former club, Avangard Omsk, on an initial try-out before signing a prorated one-year contract on 7 December 2020.

Prior to the beginning of the 2022–23 season, Goncharov as a free agent was signed to a one-year contract with Neftekhimik Nizhnekamsk on 30 August 2022. In adding a veteran presence to the blueline, Goncharov made 40 regular season apppearances in totalling 4 goals and 7 points. He was scoreless in five post-season games of a quarterfinals defeat to Ak Bars Kazan.

Career statistics

Regular season and playoffs

International

Awards and honours

References

External links

RussianProspects.com Maxim Goncharov Profile

1989 births
Living people
Arizona Coyotes draft picks
Avangard Omsk players
HC CSKA Moscow players
HC Neftekhimik Nizhnekamsk players
Portland Pirates players
Russian ice hockey defencemen
Salavat Yulaev Ufa players
San Antonio Rampage players
HC Sibir Novosibirsk players
HC Spartak Moscow players
Ice hockey people from Moscow
Russian expatriate ice hockey people